The Wells'Built Hotel (or Wells' Built Hotel) is a historic hotel that is now an African-American museum. It is located in Orlando, Florida, in the center of Orlando's historic Parramore district, at 511 West South Street. Dr. William Monroe Wells built the hotel, and a nearby entertainment venue, for African Americans visiting Orlando. During the segregation era, this hotel served as host to several now-famous African-American performers. On February 4, 2000, it was added to the U.S. National Register of Historic Places.

History
Dr. William M. Wells was a prominent African-American physician in Orlando during the first half of the 20th century. One of Orlando's first black doctors, Dr. Wells came to Orlando in 1917. In 1921 he built a hotel for African Americans barred from Florida's segregated hotels. Soon afterward, he built South Street Casino, an entertainment venue he built to host touring black entertainers. The casino served as a community center in which no gambling took place. The hotel and casino became a central icon of the African American music community.

Many famous African American performers stayed at the hotel and performed at the Casino.  A few include:
 Ella Fitzgerald
 Count Basie
 Ray Charles
 Cab Calloway
 Ivory Joe Hunter
 B.B. King
 Louis Armstrong
 Guitar Slim
 Bo Diddley
Many other prominent African Americans visited, including sports legend Jackie Robinson and Supreme Court Justice Thurgood Marshall.

Although the Casino is gone, the original hotel remains and has been converted into a modest museum of African American history.

Wells' Built Museum
The hotel is now the home of the Wells' Built Museum, which opened in June 2009. The  museum houses memorabilia of Orlando's African-American community and contains displays on the Civil Rights Movement in Orlando, along with some African art on loan from local collectors.

Exhibits include a 1930s period hotel guestroom with authentic furniture, beading and decorations, the South Street Casino, the Chitlin' Circuit performance hall that was formerly located next to the hotel, artifacts from Dr. William Monroe Wells, and other elements of Orlando's African American heritage.

The museum's full name is the Wells' Built Museum of African American History and Culture .

References

External links
 Wells'Built Museum - official site
 Article about the museum
 Podcast and photos on RICHES Mosaic Interface

See also
List of museums focused on African Americans

Gallery

Museums in Orlando, Florida
African-American museums in Florida
History museums in Florida
History of Orlando, Florida
Hotels in Orlando, Florida
Hotel buildings completed in 1926
Hotel buildings on the National Register of Historic Places in Florida
National Register of Historic Places in Orange County, Florida
Defunct hotels in Florida
Museums established in 2009
2009 establishments in Florida